Ma Qianling (Xiao'erjing: , 1826－1910) was a Chinese Muslim General who defected to the Qing Dynasty in 1872 during the Dungan revolt along with his superior General Ma Zhanao and General Ma Haiyan. He then assisted General Zuo Zongtang in crushing the rebel Muslims. In 1877 he and Ma Zhanao expelled Muslim rebels who refused to give up the fight from the hills around Hezhou. His four sons were, Ma Fucai, Ma Fulu, Ma Fushou, and Ma Fuxiang. His grandsons were Ma Hongbin and Ma Hongkui. He had three wives, one was a Muslim convert. His sons Ma Fulu and Ma Fuxiang inherited his army.

References

19th-century Chinese people
20th-century Chinese people
1826 births
1910 deaths
People from Linxia
Hui people
Chinese Muslim generals
Qing dynasty generals
Generals from Gansu